Çandarlı Halil Pasha (died 10 July 1453), known as the Younger, was a highly influential Ottoman grand vizier under the sultans Murad II and, for the first few years of his reign, Mehmed II (from 1439 to 1 June 1453 precisely).  He was a member of the Çandarlı family, a highly influential political family in the Ottoman Empire. His grandfather and namesake, Çandarlı Kara Halil Hayreddin Pasha (Çandarlı Halil Pasha the Elder), also earlier served as grand vizier, under Murad I.

Biography
Halil Pasha was the fourth and penultimate member of the Çandarlı family to hold the position of grand vizier in the Ottoman Empire. His father, Çandarlı Ibrahim Pasha the Elder, his uncle, Çandarlı Ali Pasha, and his grandfather Çandarlı Halil Pasha the Elder had also held the position in the past. His own son, Çandarlı Ibrahim Pasha the Younger, would also become grand vizier in the future.
Twice during his reign, sultan Murad II, a man more interested in religion and the arts than politics, retired to the city of Manisa. For the sultan's protection, Halil Pasha had a castle built in a nearby town, renaming it Çandarlı after his own family (the castle is still the most famous landmark in Çandarlı today). During these times of Murad II's retirement, Halil Pasha held effective control of the empire in the capital Edirne with Mehmed II, then still a child, as the nominal sultan. On both occasions, with the dangers presented by allied European armies attacking Ottoman territories, Çandarlı called back Murad II and deposed the teenaged Mehmed II to replace him with his more capable father. These two incidents led to lasting resentment by Mehmed II towards Çandarlı. The fact that the Çandarlı family had become extremely wealthy from their influence in the empire for over a century, possibly more so than even the ruling Ottoman family itself, further strained tensions between Mehmed II and Halil Pasha, the scion of the Çandarlı family.

When Mehmed II became sultan, the Byzantine emperor Constantine XI sent a messenger to the Ottomans, asking for an increase of the annuity of Mehmed II's cousin Orhan or otherwise to release him. Orhan was a distant Ottoman family member and could claim himself as pretender for the throne and potentially start a civil war. This strategy of disruption was used by the Byzantines several times before. Halil Pasha became infuriated at the message and replied to the messengers:

In 1453, one of the first acts committed by the (then fully reigning) Sultan Mehmed II immediately after the conquest of Constantinople was to imprison Çandarlı Halil Pasha. The city had been taken on 29 May 1453 and Halil Pasha's imprisonment took place on 1 June 1453. His execution followed on 10 July 1453.

Mehmed II thus ended the Çandarlı era in the Ottoman Empire, and the later members of the family became no more than provincial notables based in İznik, although they were to give yet another, short-term, grand vizier to the Ottoman Empire at the end of the 15th century (Halil's son Çandarlı Ibrahim Pasha the Younger).

Çandarlı Halil Pasha was, as such, the first Ottoman grand vizier to be executed by the sultan.

Popular culture
 Reşit Gürzap portrayed Halil Pasha in Turkish film İstanbul'un Fethi (1951).
 Halil Pasha is played by Erden Alkan in Turkish film Fetih 1453 (2012).
 Halil Pasha appears in the historical novel Porphyry and Ash. The speech he delivers to the Byzantine Emperor is the same as that made by the real Halil Pasha as recorded by George Sphrantzes
 Halil Pasha is played by Selim Bayraktar in Netflix series Rise of Empires: Ottoman.
 Halil Pasha appears as an antagonist in Kiersten White's novel “And I Darken” (2016)

See also 
 Çandarlı family
 Çandarlı, a town named by Halil Pasha
 List of Ottoman Grand Viziers

References

1453 deaths
Pashas
15th-century Grand Viziers of the Ottoman Empire
15th-century executions by the Ottoman Empire
Turks from the Ottoman Empire
Executed people from the Ottoman Empire
Grand Viziers of Mehmed the Conqueror
Year of birth unknown
Fall of Constantinople
Halil